In phonetics, ingressive sounds are sounds by which the airstream flows inward through the mouth or nose. The three types of ingressive sounds are lingual ingressive or velaric ingressive (from the tongue and the velum), glottalic ingressive (from the glottis), and pulmonic ingressive (from the lungs).

The opposite of an ingressive sound is an egressive sound, by which the air stream is created by pushing air out through the mouth or nose. The majority of sounds in most languages, such as vowels, are both pulmonic and egressive.

Lingual ingressive
Lingual ingressive, or velaric ingressive, describes an airstream mechanism in which a sound is produced by closing the vocal tract at two places of articulation in the mouth. This rarefies the air in the enclosed space by lowering the tongue and then releasing both closures. Such sounds are called "clicks".

Glottalic ingressive

Glottal ingressive is the term generally applied to the implosive consonants, which actually use a mixed glottalic ingressive–pulmonic egressive airstream. True glottalic ingressives are quite rare and are called "voiceless implosives" or "reverse ejectives".

Pulmonic ingressive
Pulmonic ingressive describes ingressive sounds in which the airstream is created by the lungs. These are generally considered paralinguistic. They may be found as phonemes, words, and entire phrases on all continents and in genetically-unrelated languages, most frequently in sounds for agreement and backchanneling. Some pulmonic ingressive sounds do not have egressive counterparts. For example, the cell for a velar trill in the IPA chart is greyed out as not being possible, but an ingressive velar (or velic) trill is a snort.

Pulmonic ingressive sounds are extremely rare outside paralinguistics. A pulmonic ingressive phoneme was found in the ritual language Damin; its last speaker died in the 1990s. ǃXóõ has a series of nasalized click consonants in which the nasal airstream is pulmonic ingressive. Ladefoged & Maddieson (1996:268) state, "This ǃXóõ click is probably unique among the sounds of the world's languages that, even in the middle of a sentence, it may have ingressive pulmonic airflow."

Ingressive speech
Ingressive speech sounds are produced while the speaker breathes in, in contrast to most speech sounds, which are produced as the speaker breathes out. The air that is used to voice the speech is drawn in rather than pushed out. Ingressive speech can be glottalic, velaric, or pulmonic.

Occurrence
Ingressive sounds occur in many languages. Despite being a common phenomenon, they are frequently associated with Scandinavian languages. Most words that are subject to ingressive speech are feedback words ("yes, no") or very short or primal (a cry of pain or sobbing). It sometimes occurs in rapid counting to maintain a steady airflow throughout a long series of unbroken sounds. It is also very common in animals, frogs, dogs, and cats (purring). In English, ingressive sounds include when one says "Huh!" (a gasping sound) to express surprise or "Sss" (an inward hiss) to express empathy when another is hurt.

Tsou and Damin have both been claimed to possess an ingressive phoneme. Neither claim has been validated to date however, and the Tsou claim has been nearly disproved. There are claims of Tohono O'odham women speaking entirely ingressively.

There are examples of ingressive sounds that belong to paralanguage. Japanese has what has been described an apicoprepalatal fricative approximant. This sound is similar to an inbreathed [s]. It is used as a response to statements that are upsetting or as a sign of deference. Japanese-speakers also use an ingressive bilateral bidental friction as a "pre-turn opening in conversation" or to begin a prayer.

Distribution
Speech technologist Robert Eklund has found reports of ingressive speech in around 50 languages worldwide, dating as far back as Cranz's (1765) "Historie von Grönland" which mentions it in female affirmations among the Eskimo.

Inhaled affirmative 'yeah'
Several languages include an affirmative "yeah", "yah", "yuh", or "yes" that is made with inhaled breath, which sounds something like a gasp. That is an example of a pulmonic ingressive and is found as follows:

 Dialects of English spoken in Ireland (Hiberno-English) and the Scottish Highlands (Highland English), typically used to express agreement and show attentiveness.
 Dialects of English spoken in Newfoundland and the Maritimes in Canada.
 Dialects of English spoken in the US state of Maine. The word is often transcribed as "ayup", and people attempting to imitate Maine accent rarely use the ingressive form. It is missing in most Maine-dialect television and Hollywood productions.
 Casual European French (ouais).
 In Faroese and Icelandic, entire phrases are sometimes produced ingressively.
 In Danish, Norwegian, and Swedish, words like "ja", "jo" (yes), "nei/nej" (no) are often pronounced with inhaled breath. The main function of inhaled speech can be paralinguistic, showing agreement with a statement and encouraging a speaker to continue, but in northern Sweden, "Yes" can be replaced with an inhalation alone. It is consequently also typical of dialogue.
 In Low German and northern German varieties of standard German, an affirmative "ja" (yes) is sometimes pronounced ingressively, especially for backchanneling.
 In Finnish, joo and niin.
 In Estonian "jah" (yes) or informally also "jep" (yep).
 In Khalkha Mongolian, the words тийм  ("that/[yes]"), үгүй  ("no"), and мэдэхгүй  know. ("[I] don't know") are often pronounced in daily conversation with pulmonic ingressive airflow.
 In Ewe and other languages of Togo, as well as in parts of Mali and Cameroon and in the Hausa language of southern Niger and northern Nigeria.
 In Philippine languages such as Tagalog  and more forcefully in Waray and softer in Borongan (Samar Province)  or  usually spelled in these countries oo and possibly stronger in Oras, Arteche, Dolores (all in Samar). The sound is almost guttural and the aspirant is inhaled, not exhaled, air. Thus, for an English-speaker exhaling the response, the exhaled sound is not understood by native Samar-speakers. The American English trouble expression "uh-oh" does not approximate it. Eastern, Western, and Northern Samar have different accents in the same dialect.

Citations

General sources

External links
 Robert Eklund's ingressive speech website. Maps, sound files, and spectrograms.
 https://www.mun.ca/marcomm/gazette/2003-2004/mar18/research.html
 http://www.speech.kth.se/prod/publications/files/qpsr/2007/2007_50_1_021-024.pdf

Phonetics
Consonants by airstream

he:מנגנון וילוני מפונם